William Joseph Ferrazzi (April 19, 1907 – August 10, 1993) was an American Major League Baseball pitcher. He played for the Philadelphia Athletics during the  season. Ferrazzi graduated from the University of Florida with a bachelor's degree in education in 1935.

Early life 
Ferrazzi was the son of Italian American immigrants, Anastasio "Ernesto" Ferrazzi and Giuseppina Rossini. His father worked as a stone cutter in the granite quarries of Quincy, MA.

See also 

 Florida Gators
 List of Florida Gators baseball players
 List of University of Florida alumni

References 

1907 births
1993 deaths
American people of Italian descent
Baseball players from Massachusetts
Florida Gators baseball players
Gainesville G-Men players
Major League Baseball pitchers
Philadelphia Athletics players
St. Augustine Saints players
Williamsport Grays players